Alastair Kenneth Yates (3 September 1952 – 26 July 2018) was an English news anchor, for over 20 years with the BBC, on BBC World News and BBC News.

Born 3 September 1952 and brought up in Burton upon Trent,  Yates was educated at Manor House School, Ashby-de-la-Zouch and the former Burton Grammar School. Before deciding on journalism as a career Yates was a circuit DJ and was MD of his own entertainments company which managed clubs and pop groups.

In 1992 he helped to launch BBC World Service Television and stayed in his post for the re-launch to BBC World in 1995. In 1997 he was part of the launch team for BBC News 24 (now the BBC News Channel). He took a couple of years out from BBC News in 1998 to become an anchor on Deutsche Welle in Germany. He returned to the BBC in 2001, again to appear on both BBC World News and the BBC News Channel.

Yates joined Sky Television from its launch in 1989, becoming the first male presenter on Sky News.

Prior to Sky News, he was with ITV: in 1986 he was presenting Anglia Television's evening news show About Anglia.
In 1980 he was at Grampian Television in Aberdeen, Scotland as presenter and reporter for North Tonight. 
He made his debut TV appearance at Pebble Mill in Birmingham in 1978 presenting news bulletins for BBC Midlands's regional news programme Midlands Today. Whilst at BBC Midlands, Yates was also a regional continuity announcer. He also appeared in some "Play for Today" dramas as himself; and hosted an inventions programme called Eureka.

He began his journalism career in radio: he was a current affairs & news host at BBC Local Radio stations in Derby, Leicester, and Birmingham.

He was to return to radio in 2013 when he joined Global Radio to produce and present news for Classic FM and Smooth Radio.

Yates, under the pseudonym Al Kay, got his broadcasting break when he began a weekly Saturday morning pop show on Radio Derby in 1973. That same station offered him the chance to move away from music-based shows to speech programming.

Yates died on 26 July 2018 at the age of 65.

References

External links

Official website

1952 births
2018 deaths
BBC newsreaders and journalists
BBC World News
Sky News newsreaders and journalists
British television journalists
People from Burton upon Trent
STV News newsreaders and journalists